Codex Coislinianus 386 is one of the important manuscripts of the treatise On the Soul by Aristotle. It is designated by the symbol C. Paleographically it had been assigned to the 11th century. It is written in Greek minuscule letters. The manuscript contains the complete text of the treatise. It belongs to the textual family ξ, together with the manuscripts T Ec Xd Pd Hd. 

The manuscript was cited by David Ross in his critical edition of the treatise On the Soul. Currently it is housed at the Bibliothèque nationale de France (Coislin 386) in Paris.

Other manuscripts 

 Codex Vaticanus 253
 Codex Vaticanus 260
 Codex Vaticanus 266
 Codex Ambrosianus 435

Further reading 

 Paweł Siwek, Aristotelis tractatus De anima graece et latine, Desclée, Romae 1965. 

Fonds Coislin
11th-century manuscripts
Aristotelian manuscripts